Three-time defending champion Kei Nishikori successfully defended his title, defeating Taylor Fritz in the final, 6–4, 6–4 to win the singles title at the 2016 Memphis Open. Notably, this was only Fritz' third career event on the ATP Tour.

Seeds
The top four seeds receive a bye into the second round.

Draw

Finals

Top half

Bottom half

Qualifying

Seeds

Qualifiers

Qualifying draw

First qualifier

Second qualifier

Third qualifier

Fourth qualifier

External links
 Main draw
 Qualifying draw

Memphis Open - Singles
2016 Men's Singles